Mariner 9 (Mariner Mars '71 / Mariner-I) was a robotic spacecraft that contributed greatly to the exploration of Mars and was part of the NASA Mariner program. Mariner 9 was launched toward Mars on May 30, 1971, from LC-36B at Cape Canaveral Air Force Station, Florida, and reached the planet on November 14 of the same year, becoming the first spacecraft to orbit another planet – only narrowly beating the Soviet probes Mars 2 (launched May 19) and Mars 3 (launched May 28), which both arrived at Mars only weeks later.

After the occurrence of dust storms on the planet for several months following its arrival, the orbiter managed to send back clear pictures of the surface. Mariner 9 successfully returned 7,329 images over the course of its mission, which concluded in October 1972.

Objectives 

Mariner 9 was designed to continue the atmospheric studies begun by Mariner 6 and 7, and to map over 70% of the Martian surface from the lowest altitude and at the highest resolutions (from 1 kilometer to 100 meters (1,100 to 110 yards) per pixel) of any Mars mission up to that point. An infrared radiometer was included to detect heat sources in search of evidence of volcanic activity. It was to study temporal changes in the Martian atmosphere and surface. Mars' two moons were also to be analyzed. Mariner 9 more than met its objectives.

Under original plans, a dual mission was to be flown like Mariners 6–7, however the launch failure of Mariner 8 ruined this scheme and forced NASA planners to fall back on a simpler one-probe mission. NASA still held out hope that another Mariner probe and Atlas-Centaur could be readied before the 1971 Mars launch window closed. A few logistical problems emerged, including the lack of an available Centaur payload shroud of the correct configuration for the Mariner probes, however there was a shroud in NASA's inventory which could be modified. Convair also had an available Centaur stage on hand and could have an Atlas readied in time, but the idea was ultimately abandoned for lack of funding.

Mariner 9 was mated to Atlas-Centaur AC-23 on May 9 with investigation into Mariner 8's failure ongoing. The malfunction was traced to a problem in the Centaur's pitch control servoamplifier and because it was not clear if the spacecraft itself had been responsible, RFI testing was conducted on Mariner 9 to ensure the probe was not releasing interference that could cause problems with the Centaur's electronics. All testing came back negative and on May 22, a tested and verified rate gyro package arrived from Convair and was installed in the Centaur.

Liftoff took place on May 30 at 22:23:04 UT. All launch vehicle systems performed normally and the Mariner separated from the Centaur at 13 minutes and 18 seconds after launch.

Instruments 
 Ultraviolet Spectrometer (UVS)
 Infrared Interferometer Spectrometer (IRIS)
 Celestial Mechanics (not a separate instrument; it relied upon tracking measurements including range, range rate, and Doppler)
 S-Band Occultation (not a separate instrument; experiment observed the attenuation of the communication signal as the orbiting satellite passed out of view)
 Infrared Radiometer (IRR)

Achievements 

Mariner 9 was the first spacecraft to orbit another planet. It carried an instrument payload similar to Mariners 6 and 7, but because of the need for a larger propulsion system to control the spacecraft in Martian orbit, it weighed more than Mariners 6 and 7 combined.

When Mariner 9 arrived at Mars on November 14, 1971, planetary scientists were surprised to find the atmosphere was thick with "a planet-wide robe of dust, the largest storm ever observed."  The surface was totally obscured. Mariner 9's computer was thus reprogrammed from Earth to delay imaging of the surface for a couple of months until the dust settled. The main surface imaging did not get underway until mid-January 1972.  However, surface-obscured images did contribute to the collection of Mars science, including understanding of the existence of several huge high-altitude volcanoes of the Tharsis Bulge that gradually became visible as the dust storm abated.  This unexpected situation made a strong case for the desirability of studying a planet from orbit rather than merely flying past. It also highlighted the importance of flexible mission software. The Soviet Union's Mars 2 and Mars 3 probes, which arrived during the same dust storm, were unable to adapt to the unexpected conditions, which severely limited the amount of data that they were able to collect.

After 349 days in orbit, Mariner 9 had transmitted 7,329 images, covering 85% of Mars' surface, whereas previous flyby missions had returned less than one thousand images covering only a small portion of the planetary surface. 
Mars' small moons, Phobos and Deimos, were also photographed.

The findings from the Mariner 9 mission underpinned the later Viking program.

The enormous Valles Marineris canyon system is named after Mariner 9 in honor of its achievements.

After depleting its supply of attitude control gas, the spacecraft was turned off on October 27, 1972.

Construction 

The ultraviolet spectrometer aboard Mariner 9 was constructed by the Laboratory for Atmospheric and Space Physics at the University of Colorado, Boulder, Colorado. The ultraviolet spectrometer team was led by Professor Charles Barth.

The Infrared Interferometer Spectrometer (IRIS) team was led by Dr. Rudolf A. Hanel from NASA Goddard Spaceflight Center (GSFC). The IRIS instrument was built by Texas Instruments, Dallas, Texas.

The Infrared Radiometer (IRR) team was led by Professor Gerald Neugebauer from the California Institute of Technology (Caltech).

Error-correction codes achievements 
To control for errors in the reception of the grayscale image data sent by Mariner 9 (caused by a low signal-to-noise ratio), the data had to be encoded before transmission using a so-called forward error-correcting code (FEC). Without FEC, noise would have made up roughly a quarter of a received image, while the FEC encoded the data in a redundant way which allowed for the reconstruction of most of the sent image data at reception.

Since the flown hardware was constrained with regards to weight, power consumption, storage, and computing power, some considerations had to be put into choosing an FEC, and it was decided to use a Hadamard code for Mariner 9. Each image pixel was represented as a six-bit binary value, which had 64 possible grayscale levels. Because of limitations of the transmitter, the maximum useful data length was about 30 bits. Instead of using a repetition code, a [32, 6, 16] Hadamard code was used, which is also a 1st-order Reed-Muller code. Errors of up to seven bits per each 32-bit word could be corrected using this scheme. Compared to a five-repetition code, the error correcting properties of this Hadamard code were much better, yet its data rate was comparable. The efficient decoding algorithm was an important factor in the decision to use this code. The circuitry used was called the "Green Machine", which employed the fast Fourier transform, increasing the decoding speed by a factor of three.

Present location 
As of February 2022, Mariner 9's location is unknown; it is either still in orbit, or has already burned up in the Martian atmosphere or crashed into the surface of Mars.

NASA has provided multiple dates for when Mariner 9 could enter the Martian atmosphere. In 2011, NASA predicted that Mariner 9 would burn up or crash into Mars around 2022. However, a 2018 revision to the Mariner 9 mission page by NASA expected Mariner 9 would crash into Mars "sometime around 2020". At the time of the mission, Mariner 9 was left in an orbit that would not decay for at least 50 years, which placed the earliest date of atmospheric entry to October 2022.

See also 

 Exploration of Mars
 List of Mars orbiters
 List of missions to Mars
 Space exploration
 Timeline of artificial satellites and space probes
 Unmanned space missions
 Mars flyby

References

External links 

Mariner 9 Mission Profile by NASA's Solar System Exploration
NSSDC Master Catalog: Spacecraft – Mariner 9
NASA-JPL Guide to Mariner 9
some Mariner 9 images of Mars
Mariner 9 approaching Mars movie 
Mariner 9 images, including dust storm
Mariner 9 view of Phobos (hosted by The Planetary Society)
Mariner 9 image compared to MGS image, helps determine if Dunes moved in decades
P.418  Correct DN values appear to be 512, not 64  i.e. 9bits per pixel

Mariner program
Missions to Mars
1971 in spaceflight
Derelict satellites orbiting Mars
Derelict space probes
Spacecraft launched by Atlas-Centaur rockets
Spacecraft launched in 1971
Geography of Mars